The Sinosphere is the Mainland Southeast Asia linguistic area. The linguist James Matisoff coined the term "Sinosphere" in 1990, contrasting with the Indosphere, "I refer to the Chinese and Indian areas of linguistic/cultural influence in Southeast Asia as the 'Sinosphere' and the 'Indosphere'."

For Mainland Southeast Asia (MSEA) the term has been glossed as "Sinosphere: a socio-political sphere of MSEA, subsuming those countries, cultures, and languages that have historically come under influence from the politics, culture, religion, and languages of China ."

See also
Indosphere
Sinophone
Sinosphere
Sprachbund

References

Sino-Tibetan languages
Sprachbund